The 2010 CSU Pueblo ThunderWolves football team represented Colorado State University–Pueblo as a member of the Rocky Mountain Athletic Conference (RMAC) during 2010 NCAA Division II football season. Led by third-year head coach John Wristen, the ThunderWolves compiled an overall record of 9–2 with a mark of 7–2 in conference play, tying for third place in the RMAC. CSU Pueblo played their home games at Neta and Eddie DeRose ThunderBowl in Pueblo, Colorado.

Schedule

Ranking movements

References

CSU-Pueblo ThunderWolves football
CSU Pueblo ThunderWolves football seasons
CSU-Pueblo ThunderWolves football